Lipná (German: Lindau) is a village in Karlovy Vary Region, Czech Republic. It is one of the six municipality districts of Hazlov. In 2001 the village had a population of 15.

In village are found a sawmill, bus stop and a shop with wood products.

Geography 
Lipná lies 2 kilometres west from Hazlov, about 530 meters above sea level. It is surrounded by forests. It neighbour with Hazlov to the east, with Polná to the southwest and with Skalka to the northeast. To the west there is the German border. Close to the village flows Ostrožský potok.

History 
Lipná was first mentioned in 1307. Village was always small, because of no much work here. People work in agricultural or in a small quarry only.

Landmarks 
 Conciliation cross from 1675,
 Few little chapels.

References 

Hazlov
Villages in Cheb District